Tiberiu Ionuț Căpușă (born 6 April 1998) is a Romanian professional footballer who plays as a defender for Liga I club Chindia Târgoviște.

International career
He made his debut for Romania national football team on 6 June 2021 in a friendly against England. He substituted Deian Sorescu in the 66th minute and conceded a penalty kick a minute later by fouling Jack Grealish in the penalty area. England converted the penalty and won 1–0.

Personal life
Tiberiu Căpușă is the son of Giani Capușă former player FC Bacău, Politehnica Iași, Foresta Fălticeni and FC Vaslui.

Career statistics

Club

International

Honours
Viitorul Constanța
Supercupa României: 2019

References

External links
 
 

1998 births
Living people
Sportspeople from Bacău
Romanian footballers
Association football defenders
Romania youth international footballers
Romania under-21 international footballers
Romania international footballers
Liga I players
FC Viitorul Constanța players
AFC Chindia Târgoviște players
Liga II players
FC Universitatea Cluj players